2016 Cambodian League or 2016 Metfone Cambodian League is the 32nd season of the Cambodian League. Contested by 10 clubs, it operates on a system of promotion and relegation with Cambodian Second League.
Western Phnom Penh decided to merge with Cambodian Tiger, but later both team couldn't reach an agreement. The league starts from 19 February until 14 August. Phnom Penh Crown are the defending champions.

Teams
 Asia Euro United
 Boeung Ket Angkor
 Cambodian Tiger 
 CMAC United (withdrew) but later decided to participate again after had sponsorship from Japanese company.
 Nagaworld
 National Defense Ministry
 National Police Commissary
 Phnom Penh Crown
 Preah Khan Reach Svay Rieng
 Western Phnom Penh
 Build Bright United (withdrew)
 Kirivong Sok Sen Chey (withdrew)
Source:

Personnel and sponsoring

Stadiums and locations

Foreign players

The number of foreign players is restricted to five per team. A team can use four foreign players on the field in each game, including at least one player from the AFC country.

League table

Result table

Matches

Fixtures and Results of the cambodia metfone league 2016 season.

Week 1

Week 2

Week 3

Week 4

Week 5

Week 6

Week 7

Week 8

Week 9

Week 10

Week 11

Week 12

Week 13

Week 14

Week 15

Week 16

Week 17

Week 18

Top scorers

Hat-tricks

4 players scored 4 goals

Clean sheets

Awards

See also
 2016 Cambodian Second League
 2016 Hun Sen Cup

References

Cambodia
C-League seasons
Cambodia
1